The 2018 Philadelphia Freedoms season was the 18th season of the franchise (in its current incarnation) in World TeamTennis (WTT).

Season recap

Drafts
At the WTT Player Draft on March 13, 2018, the Freedoms selected Amanda Anisimova, Kevin King, and Kevin Anderson.

Season
Led by returning coach and Coach of the Year, Craig Karden, US Open (tennis) champion Sloane Stephens, WTT Male Rookie of the Year, Kevin King, and returning fan favorite and Female MVP Taylor Townsend, the Freedoms put together a successful regular season by going 12-2 and qualifying for a spot in the championship.

While the Freedoms played their home games at Hagan Arena at St. Joe's, the championship game was held at the Daskalakis Athletic Center at Drexel University. The Freedoms took on the Springfield Lasers and lost the first two sets of the match in men's and women's doubles and went down 10-5 at the half. However, the Freedoms managed to re-take the lead 15-14 following two convincing wins in mixed doubles and a dominating women's singles performance by Taylor Townsend. The championship came down to the final set in the form of men's singles where Kevin King took a 3-1 lead over Miomir Kecmanović. However, Kecmanović stormed back and won four straight games including a break of King twice to give the Lasers a 19-18 victory and the championship.

Team Personnel

On-court personnel
 Craig Kardon, Head Coach
 Sloane Stephens
 Taylor Townsend
 Fabrice Martin
 Kevin Anderson
 Raquel Atawo
 Kevin King
 Gabriela Dabrowski (substitute)
 Jackson Withrow (substitute)

Front office
 Billie Jean King – Owner
 Barbara Perry – General Manager

References

Philadelphia Freedoms 2018
Philadelphia Freedoms season

Sources